The 1814 platinum half dollar (J-44) was a United States pattern coin with a face value of fifty cents. Its design was identical to the Capped Bust half dollar, but struck in platinum.

A unique example with 33 "P" punch marks has been given the catalog number J-44a. It has been described as "one of the most intriguing - and mysterious - pattern coins ever produced by the United States." There are two examples known without the punch marks.

See also
 Platinum coin

References

Fifty-cent coins of the United States
Platinum coins
1814 in the United States